Miss India is a 2020 Indian Telugu-language business drama film written and directed by Narendra Nath.  It stars Keerthy Suresh, Jagapathi Babu, Rajendra Prasad, Naresh, Nadhiya, and Naveen Chandra. The plot follows Manasa Samayuktha (Keerthy), a girl from a middle-class South Indian family, who dreams of having her tea business in the US. The film received negative reviews.

The film has been produced by Mahesh S. Koneru under East Coast Productions. Dani Sanchez-Lopez and Sujith Vaassudev handled the cinematography, while S. Thaman composed the music. The film was planned to be released on 17 April 2020 but has been postponed due to the COVID-19 pandemic. The film is released on Netflix on 4 November 2020 in Telugu along with dubbed versions in Tamil and Malayalam.

Plot

Manasa Samyuktha (Keerthy Suresh), a woman with big goals from a middle-class family, moves to the USA after her brother Arjun (Kamal Kamaraju) got a job. She dreams of starting up her own tea business as promised to her grandfather (Rajendra Prasad) to continue his legacy but her family does not agree due to financial problems. On the way to becoming a successful businesswoman, she is forced to deal with sexism, criticism, and rivalry with Kailash Sivakumar (KSK) (Jagapathi Babu). KSK is a dangerous rival coffee manufacturer who tries to put her down, saying that a woman can never be successful, especially in business. Manasa decides to beat him and show him that a woman can be anything she aspires to be. The story revolves around her journey and the problems she faces while she attempts to start up her business.

Cast
Keerthy Suresh as Manasa Samyuktha 
Jagapathi Babu as Kailash Sivakumar a.k.a. KSK
Rajendra Prasad as Dr. Vishwanath, Manasa, Sahana, and Arjun's grandfather
Naresh as Sivarama Krishna, Manasa, Sahana, and Arjun's father
Nadhiya as Kamala, Manasa, Sahana and Arjun's mother
Naveen Chandra as Vijay Anand, Manasa's former love interest	
Bhanu Sri Mehra as Sahana, Manasa's elder sister
Sumanth Shailendra as Vikram, Manasa's business partner
Kamal Kamaraju as Arjun Chaitanya, Manasa's elder brother
Praveen as Vijju, an employee in Miss India
Pujita Ponnada as Padma Nayana, Manasa's classmate, and deceiver 
 Divya Sripada as Preethi, Manasa's friend

Soundtrack 

The music is composed by S. Thaman and released by Aditya Music. The first single, "Kotthaga Kotthaga" written by Kalyan Chakravarthi and sung by Shreya Ghoshal and S. Thaman, was released on 7 February 2020. The next single "Lacha Gummadi" was sung by Srivardhini and released on 28 October 2020. The third single "Theme of Miss India" was sung by Harika Narayan and Sruthi Ranjani and was released on 29 October 2020. The album was released on 2 November 2020.

Release 
The film was released on Netflix on 4 November 2020 in Telugu along with dubbed versions in Tamil and Malayalam Languages.

References

External links 
 

2020 drama films
2020s Telugu-language films
Indian business films
Indian drama films
Films postponed due to the COVID-19 pandemic
Telugu-language Netflix original films
Films set in Andhra Pradesh
Indian films set in New York City